Deborah Drake Matthews is a former Canadian politician who served as the 10th deputy premier of Ontario from 2013 to 2018. A member of the Liberal Party, Matthews was the member of Provincial Parliament (MPP) for London North Centre from 2003 to 2018, and was a cabinet minister from 2008 to 2018 in the governments of Dalton McGuinty and Kathleen Wynne.

Early life and education
Matthews was born in London, Ontario. She is the third of nine children born to Donald Jeune Matthews, former president of the Progressive Conservative Party of Canada. Her mother was Joyce Eleanor Matthews, and her sister is Shelley Peterson, the wife of former Ontario Premier David Peterson.

She graduated from St. George's Public School and A.B. Lucas Secondary School. She studied at the University of Western Ontario where she earned a PhD in social demography. Her doctoral dissertation was entitled the "Consequences of immigrant concentration in Canada, 2001–2051." She worked at a number of positions in private business and also taught at the University of Western Ontario. Matthews was honoured twice on the University Students' Council Teaching Honour Roll at the University of Western Ontario.

Political career
Matthews has been involved in the Liberal Party since 1975, when she helped run Peterson's campaign in the old riding of London Centre. She co-chaired the Liberal Party's provincial campaigns in the elections of 1987 and 1995. Matthews was elected as President of the Ontario Liberal Party in 2003 and held the post until resigning in late 2006.

2003 election 
In the 2003 election, Matthews defeated Progressive Conservative cabinet minister Dianne Cunningham by almost 7,000 votes. On October 23, 2003, she was appointed the parliamentary assistant to the minister of community and social services, Sandra Pupatello.

2007 election and in cabinet 
Matthews was re-elected in the 2007 election. She was appointed as the minister of children and youth services and minister responsible for women's issues after the election. On December 4, 2008, Matthews introduced Ontario's Poverty Reduction Strategy as chair of the Cabinet Committee on Poverty Reduction. The long-term reduction plan set a target to reduce the number of children living in poverty by 25 per cent over 5 years. On October 7, 2009, Matthews was named the minister of health and long-term care to replace David Caplan.

2011 election 
Matthews was re-elected in the 2011 election, and was re-appointed as health minister on October 20, 2011. In 2012, Matthews came under pressure because of revelations at Ornge, Ontario's air ambulance service. Members of the opposition Progressive Conservative and New Democratic parties called for her to resign. In response to the revelations at Ornge, Matthews announced an Ontario Provincial Police (OPP) investigation. During the Liberal Party leadership race in 2013, she was an early supporter of Kathleen Wynne's candidacy to lead the party.

2014 election 
Following her re-election in 2014, Matthews was shuffled from health to a revamped role as president of the Treasury Board. On June 13, 2016, she retained her position as deputy premier and was also appointed as minister of advanced education and skills development. She was additionally responsible for digital government. Matthews left cabinet on January 17, 2018, having declined re-election in the 2018 election.

Cabinet positions

Electoral record

References

Notes

Citations

External links

1953 births
21st-century Canadian politicians
21st-century Canadian women politicians
Deputy premiers of Ontario
Health ministers of Ontario
Living people
Members of the Executive Council of Ontario
Ontario Liberal Party MPPs
Politicians from London, Ontario
University of Western Ontario alumni
Women government ministers of Canada
Women MPPs in Ontario